Patrick McCabe Buckley (31 January 1925 – 4 November 2008) was a Scottish footballer, who played for Bo'ness United, St Johnstone, Aberdeen and the Scotland national team.

Buckley, a striker renowned for his speed, started his career with Junior club Bo'ness United. He was at the centre of a transfer dispute in 1948, when both Celtic and St Johnstone claimed to have signed him. The situation was eventually resolved in St Johnstone's favour and Buckley spent the next four seasons with the Perth side. He joined Aberdeen in a £7,500 transfer in April 1952 and it is for his time with the Dons for which he is best known. He helped them to the League championship in 1954–55 and the 1955 League Cup success. He also played in two Scottish Cup finals, 1953 and 1954, both of which were lost. He retired due to a serious knee injury in 1957 but briefly returned to the game with Highland League side Inverness Caledonian the following year.

Buckley was capped three times by Scotland, making his debut in a 1–0 win over Norway in 1954. Initially selected in the squad for the 1954 FIFA World Cup, injury saw him replaced by club colleague George Hamilton. He scored his only Scotland goal against Wales in a 1–0 win upon his return to fitness in October later that year.

Upon his death in November 2008, the Aberdeen players wore black armbands to commemorate his playing for the club, against St Mirren on 12 November 2008.

His son, Pat, was also a professional footballer.

References

External links
Obituary in The Herald

1925 births
2008 deaths
Scottish Football League players
Scottish footballers
Scotland international footballers
St Johnstone F.C. players
Aberdeen F.C. players
People from Leith
Association football forwards
Scottish Football League representative players
Caledonian F.C. players
Highland Football League players
Place of death missing
Bo'ness United F.C. players
Footballers from Edinburgh
Scottish Junior Football Association players